Maryukhino is a rural locality (a village) in Novlenskoye Rural Settlement, Vologodsky District, Vologda Oblast, Russia. The population was 298 as of 2002. There are 8 streets.

Geography 
Maryukhino is located 8 km south of Vologda (the district's administrative centre) by road. Petrovskoye is the nearest rural locality.

References 

Rural localities in Vologodsky District